The 2015 Città di Vercelli – Trofeo Multimed was a professional tennis tournament played on clay courts. It was the second edition of the tournament which was part of the 2015 ATP Challenger Tour. It took place in Vercelli, Italy between April 20 and 26.

Singles main-draw entrants

Seeds

 1 Rankings are as of April 13, 2015

Other entrants
The following players received wildcards into the singles main draw:
  Gianluca Mager
  Stefano Napolitano
  Salvatore Caruso
  Gianluigi Quinzi

The following players received entry from the qualifying draw:
  Benjamin Balleret
  Maxime Hamou
  Antonio Šančić
  Yann Marti

The following player received entry as a lucky loser:
  Omar Giacalone

Champions

Singles

 Taro Daniel def.  Filippo Volandri, 6–3, 1–6, 6–4

Doubles

 Andrea Arnaboldi /  Hans Podlipnik Castillo def.  Sergey Betov /  Michail Elgin, 6–7(5–7), 7–5, [10–3]

References

 Singles Main Draw

Citta' di Vercelli - Trofeo Multimed
Città di Vercelli – Trofeo Multimed